Maldaha Uttar Lok Sabha constituency (spelling as spelled by Election Commission of India) is one of the 543 parliamentary constituencies in India. All the seven assembly segments of No. 7 Maldaha Uttar Lok Sabha constituency are in Malda district  of West Bengal. As per order of the Delimitation Commission in respect of the delimitation of constituencies in the West Bengal, Malda Lok Sabha constituency ceased to exist from 2009 and two new ones came into being: Maldaha Uttar Lok Sabha constituency and  Maldaha Dakshin Lok Sabha constituency.

Assembly segments

Maldaha Uttar Lok Sabha constituency (parliamentary constituency No. 7) is composed of the following assembly segments:

Members of Parliament

Election results

General election 2019

General election 2014

General election 2009

Demographics

References

See also
 List of Constituencies of the Lok Sabha

Lok Sabha constituencies in West Bengal
Politics of Malda district
Maldah